Thomas Gerard Philip Gallagher (born 1954) is a Scottish political scientist. He taught politics at the University of Bradford until 2011 and is now Emeritus Professor of Politics at the university.

Career
Gallagher obtained a BA hons degree in Politics and Modern History from the University of Manchester in 1975 and a Ph.D. from Government from the same institution in 1978. He taught history at Edge Hill College, Lancashire until 1980, before joining the staff at the University of Bradford where he obtained a personal chair in 1996.

Bibliography

Single-authored Books on politics and contemporary history

Novels

Selected edited volumes

Other

Selected articles

References

External links 
 
 Articles by Tom Gallagher at The Commentator

1954 births
Living people
Academics of the University of Bradford
Alumni of the University of Manchester
20th-century Scottish historians
Scottish male writers
21st-century Scottish historians
Writers from Glasgow